Bullard Creek is a stream in Goodhue County, in the U.S. state of Minnesota.

Bullard Creek was named for George W. Bullard, an early settler.

See also
List of rivers of Minnesota

References

Rivers of Goodhue County, Minnesota
Rivers of Minnesota
Southern Minnesota trout streams